Nuno Amorim, better known as Ni Amorim, is a racecar driver born in Porto, Portugal on March 1, 1962.

National career
Amorim started competing in circuit racing and rallying in 1982, but in the mid-1980s he was almost exclusively a touring car racing driver, becoming a mainstay in various one-make cups and the Portuguese Touring Car Championship.

He was Group N Champion in 1987, and later won the Group A Championship in 1989 and 1990 driving the Poligrupo Ford Sierra RS500, and 1993 with the works Opel Astra (Gr. N).

He returned to the Portuguese Touring Car Championship in 2007 in a semi-works BMW 320si, his first full season in Portugal since 1994.

International career
After a few outings as a Mercedes-AMG driver in the Macau Grand Prix's Guia Race, he began an international career in 1995, first in the International Touring Car Championship and in the following year in the Spanish Touring Car Championship.

In 1997 he lost Opel backing and moved to endurance racing, competing on-and-off in the FIA GT Championship and the American Le Mans Series, as well as the 24 Hours of Le Mans. The high point of his career was at the wheel of the Oreca-run works Chrysler team, with the Chrysler Viper GTS-R and the Chrysler LMP, in 1999 and 2000.

He has also driven in the Spanish and British GT Championship, where he was class champion in 2004. For 2005, he moved to the Le Mans Endurance Series, where he drove a Courage C65.

In 2006, he partnered Manuel Gião to second place in the Spanish GT Championship, in a Ferrari 360 Modena. In 2007, while maintaining a full-time national schedule, he drove a Ferrari 430 in the Spanish GT Championship and the International GT Open.

24 Hours of Le Mans results

References

External links
 

1962 births
Living people
Portuguese racing drivers
24 Hours of Le Mans drivers
FIA GT Championship drivers
Deutsche Tourenwagen Masters drivers
British GT Championship drivers
European Le Mans Series drivers
Sportspeople from Porto
Oreca drivers
Team Joest drivers